David Jalbert may refer to:
 David Jalbert (folk musician), Canadian folk musician and singer-songwriter
 David Jalbert (pianist), Canadian concert pianist and professor